North Greenwich is a London Underground station served by the Jubilee line. Despite its name, it is not in the local area historically known as North Greenwich, on the Isle of Dogs, north of the River Thames; a completely different North Greenwich station used to be there, from 1872 until 1926. It is actually closer to Charlton than to Greenwich; however, it is at the northernmost tip of the Royal Borough of Greenwich, which perhaps gives the best explanation of the name.

The tube station opened on 14 May 1999. It is adjacent to The O2 (originally the Millennium Dome) at the northern end of the Greenwich Peninsula, on the south bank of the Thames. It is the easternmost below-ground station on the line.

History
An Underground station was first proposed for the Greenwich Peninsula in a government report on the redevelopment of London's Docklands published in 1973. The proposal, part of the then unbuilt Fleet line, proposed a line running from Charing Cross via Fenchurch Street to Beckton, with stations on each side at Millwall and Custom House. The proposal was developed during the 1970s as the Fleet line developed into the Jubilee line. The route was approved in 1980, but financial constraints meant that the route was not proceeded with. By the start of the 1990s new plans had been developed to extend the Jubilee line on a route south of the River Thames towards Stratford with North Greenwich station built in accordance with this plan.

Opened on 14 May 1999, North Greenwich is one of the largest stations on the Jubilee line, capable of handling around 20,000 passengers an hour, having been designed to cope with the large number of visitors expected at the Millennium Dome (now The O2).

The track layout at North Greenwich was designed to allow a branch off the line from this station. A branch towards Thamesmead was planned; however this has not been developed beyond the initial proposal, and is not currently in Transport for London's investment programme.

The track layout allows trains from both Stanmore and Stratford to terminate at North Greenwich. A number of trains from Stanmore terminate here during peak and off-peak times, and enter platform 2 instead of the usual platform 3. Trains head back towards central London from platform 2. During times of disruption and engineering work, trains from and back to Stratford can be routed into and out of platform 2.

The striking blue-tiled and glazed interior, with raking concrete columns rearing up inside the huge underground space, was designed by the architectural practice Alsop, Lyall and Störmer. The blue tiles on walls were inspired by the design of MTR stations in Hong Kong, where every station adopts a livery in order to help passengers to recognise their alighting stop.

As with other stations on the Jubilee Line Extension, all platforms are equipped with platform screen doors.

On 20 October 2016, the military conducted a controlled explosion on an improvised explosive device at North Greenwich after a passenger spotted an unattended bag filled with "wires and an alarm clock" aboard a Jubilee line train. No injuries were reported, and a suspect was later detained. The man, Damon Smith, was convicted of possession of an explosive substance with intent and was sentenced to 15 years' imprisonment.

Connections
The bus station is interconnected and above the tube station on the surface for direct transfer with London Buses routes 108, 129, 132, 161, 180, 188, 335, 422, 472 and 486, serving the station.

The London Cable Car opened nearby on 28 June 2012, providing a link between the Greenwich Peninsula and the Royal Victoria Dock and ExCeL London.

References

External links
 

Jubilee line stations
London Underground Night Tube stations
Tube stations in the Royal Borough of Greenwich
Transport architecture in London
Will Alsop buildings
Railway stations in Great Britain opened in 1999